The chreia or chria was, in antiquity and the Byzantine Empire, both a genre of literature and one of the progymnasmata.

Definition

A chreia was a brief, useful (χρεία means "use") anecdote about a particular character.  That is, a chreia was shorter than a narration—often as short as a single sentence—but unlike a maxim, it was attributed to a character.  Usually it conformed to one of a few patterns, the most common being "On seeing..." (ιδών or cum vidisset), "On being asked..." (ἐρωτηθείς or interrogatus), and "He said..." (ἔφη or dixit). This is similar to the use of koans by zen buddhists.

Examples

The following chreia, the most common in ancient sources, is illustrative:

Chreiai could be silly:

Or solemn

Wise:

Or witty:

Or all of these:

As a literary genre the chreia was a subject of collection. Scholars such as Plutarch or Seneca kept their own private collections of chreiai.  Published collections were also available.  The chreia is primarily known, however, for its role in education.  Students were introduced to simple chreiai almost as soon as they could read.  Later they practiced the complex grammar of Greek by putting these chreiai through changes of voice and tense.  As one of the last stages in their preparation for rhetoric—this is where chreiai serve as one of the progymnasmata—they would elaborate the theme of a chreiai into a formal eight-paragraph essay.  The student would praise, paraphrase, explain, contrast, compare, provide an example, make a judgment, and, in conclusion, exhort the reader.

Chreiai are also common in the New Testament, mainly in the Gospels. An example is:

This famous passage in Luke also has the typical structure of a chreia, though its length is somewhat unusual:

Notes

References
Hock, Ronald F., Edward N. O'Neil. 1986. The Chreia in Ancient Rhetoric. Vol. 1. Atlanta: Scholars Press.
Hock, Ronald F., Edward N. O'Neil. 2002. The Chreia in Ancient Rhetoric. Vol. 2. Atlanta: Society of Biblical Literature.
Hock, Ronald F. 2012. The Chreia in Ancient Rhetoric. Vol. 3. Atlanta: Society of Biblical Literature.

Rhetoric
Narrative techniques
Cynicism
Ancient Greek literature